The 1982–83 I-Divisioona season was the ninth season of the I-Divisioona, the second level of Finnish ice hockey. 10 teams participated in the league, and HPK Hämeenlinna and JoKP Joensuu qualified for the promotion/relegation round of the SM-liiga.

Regular season

Playoffs

First round 
 JYP Jyväskylä - Koo-Vee 2:1 (4:2, 1:2, 10:0) 
 KooKoo - KalPa Kuopio  0:2 (3:4, 2:6)

Second round 
 HPK Hämeenlinna - JYP Jyväskylä 3:0 (6:2, 6:1, 8:2)
 JoKP Joensuu - KalPa Kuopio 3:1 (13:2, 3:4, 6:5, 9:2)

External links
 Season on hockeyarchives.info

I-Divisioona seasons
2
Fin